is a town located in Kunigami District, Okinawa Prefecture, Japan.

In October 2016, the town had an estimated population of 11,259 and a density of 300 persons per km2. The population of the town is concentrated on a strip of land on the coast of Kin Bay. Kin is home to Camp Hansen, a military base of the United States Marines, as well as other smaller military installations.

Kin is home to the Dragon Brand of awamori, with a Buddhist shrine built in 1522, and a 270-meter natural cave known as Kin Shonyudo that doubles as both a place of worship and a cellar for aging bottles of the drink. Kin is also claimed to be the origin of taco rice, a dish emblematic of modern Okinawan cuisine.

Geography

Kin is located at the middle of Okinawa Island, and is roughly triangular in shape.

Neighboring municipalities
Uruma
Onna
Ginoza

Districts

Kin is divided into five districts.
 serves as the central business and administrative district of the town. 50% of the population of the town lives in the district. The main gate of Camp Hansen is located in the Kinbu district, and consequently, businesses that cater to the population of the base are located within the district.
, along with Kin district, forms the most populated parts of the town.
 is the northernmost district in the city, and borders the village of Ginoza. Nakagawa is the most agricultural part of Kin.
 is largely base land. 80% of the district is used by the United States military; the remainder of the land is agricultural, and is used for rice production.
 sits in the south of Kin on the border of the city of Uruma. Some of the hilly areas of Yaka have been developed for agriculture.

Government

Kin is governed  from the Kin Town Office in the central district of the town, also known as Kin. The municipal Board of Education oversees the middle school, three elementary schools, three nursery school, and other community facilities in the town. The Kin Municipal Assembly consists of 16 members who serve a four-year term, and are led by a chairperson and vice-chairperson.

The Okinawa Prefecture Police provides law enforcement for Kin; the town has no municipal police service. The Ishikawa Police Station, located in nearby Uruma, covers Kin, as well as the town of Onna, Ginoza, and the Ishikawa area of Uruma.

Education
The municipal schools are:
 Kin Junior High School (金武中学校)
 Kagei Elementary School (嘉芸小学校)
 Kin Elementary School (金武小学校)
 Nakagawa Elementary School (中川小学校)

Noted places

Kin is home to the Kin Kannon-ji, a Buddhist temple that traces its history to the 16th century. By tradition the temple was constructed by Nisshō Shōnin, a resident of Ise who was attempting to travel to China. Nisshō Shōnin was shipwrecked in the Ryukyu Islands, and took refuge at the small port of Funaya in Kin. There he founded the temple. The hondō main hall of the temple was reconstructed in 1942. Unlike most structures in southern Okinawa Island, it was not destroyed in the Battle of Okinawa. The wooden structure is designated an important cultural property by the Town of Kin. The temple additionally serves as a site for the display of traditional handicrafts, festivals, and performances.

United States military bases

Kin is home to Camp Hansen, a U.S. Marine Corps base that supports ground combat, communications, 31st MEU(SOC), 7th Communication Battalion, 9th Engineer Support Battalion, 12th Marine Regiment, 3d MEF Headquarters Group, 3 MEF Special Operations Training Group Small Craft Raid Platoon and other battle elements. Historically, Kin is known as an entertainment location for the U.S. Marines stationed there.

After the terrorist attacks of 9/11, Marines from U.S. 3d Marine Division were able to leave directly out of the ports in Kin via HSV Ferry to deploy to other areas in the Far East rather than flying.

References

Towns in Okinawa Prefecture